The 2023 Ohio Bobcats football team will represent Ohio University as a member of the East Division of the Mid-American Conference (MAC) in the 2023 NCAA Division I FBS football season. They will be led by third-year head coach Tim Albin and play their home games at Peden Stadium in Athens, Ohio.

Previous season

The Bobcats finished the 2022 season 10–4 and 7–1 in the MAC and won the MAC East for the first time since 2016.   They lost to Toledo in the MAC Championship Game and defeated Wyoming in the Arizona Bowl

Offseason

Transfers 
Source:

Outgoing

Incoming

Schedule

Game summaries

at San Diego State

vs. LIU

at Florida Atlantic

vs. Iowa State

at Bowling Green

vs. Kent State

vs. Northern Illinois

vs. Western Michigan

vs. Miami (OH)

at Buffalo

vs. Central Michigan

at Akron

Personnel

Coaching staff
Since July 14, 2021, the head coach of the Ohio Bobcats has been Tim Albin. He heads a staff of ten assistant coaches, four graduate assistants, a director of football operations, and numerous other support staff.

References

Ohio
Ohio Bobcats football seasons
Ohio Bobcats football